William A. Libbey III (March 27, 1855 – September 6, 1927) was an American professor of physical geography at Princeton University. He was twice a member of the U.S. Olympic Rifle Team, and rose to the rank of colonel in the New Jersey National Guard. He is also known for his first ascent of Mount Princeton in 1877. He also competed at the 1912 Summer Olympics.

Biography

Early life

He was born in Jersey City, New Jersey to William Libbey, Jr., a wealthy New York City merchant, and Elizabeth Marsh (Libbey).  As an undergraduate at Princeton Libbey was responsible for the adoption of orange and black as the school colors.  During his freshman year he wore a tie, on a dare from classmate Melanchthon Jacobus, with the colors of William III of England, Prince of Orange-Nassau, after whom Nassau Street had been named in 1724, and later Nassau Hall in 1756.  The next year he arranged for the manufacture of 1,000 yards of orange and black ribbon and proceeded to sell it, from the Grand Union Hotel, at an intercollegiate regatta in Saratoga, New York as "Princeton's colors."  After the Princeton crew team won, he sold out and orange and black have been Princeton's definitive colors ever since.

Professor

Libbey graduated from Princeton in 1877 and that summer went on the Princeton scientific expedition to the West.  It was there that on the afternoon of July 17, 1877, at 12:30 pm he reached the summit of Mount Princeton. Following his summer in the West, Libbey studied in Berlin and Paris.

Libbey returned and received his doctorate in geology in 1879, the first awarded by Princeton.  In 1880 he was appointed as director of the Elizabeth Marsh Museum of Geology and Archaeology as well as an associate professor to teach physical geography.  In 1883 he was appointed as a full professor and continued to teach the physical geography classes.

In 1897 Libbey was involved with the controversy concerning whether the Acoma people had once lived on Enchanted Mesa.  After great exertion, he spent a couple of hours on the mesa top and concluded that nothing was there and that it had never been occupied.  Subsequent work by archaeologists have shown that Libbey's conclusion was hasty.

At the 1912 Summer Olympics he won the silver medal as a member of the American team in the team running deer, single shots competition.

Libbey died in Princeton, New Jersey.

References

External links

 "William Libbey and the 1877 Expedition" Princeton Alumni Weekly Princeton University
 "William Libbey Correspondence, 1876-1925" Princeton University profile
 "William Libbey Correspondence" Princeton University listed correspondents
 

1855 births
1927 deaths
Sportspeople from Jersey City, New Jersey
American mountain climbers
American male sport shooters
Running target shooters
American geographers
American geologists
American archaeologists
Olympic silver medalists for the United States in shooting
Shooters at the 1912 Summer Olympics
Medalists at the 1912 Summer Olympics
Princeton University faculty
Princeton University alumni
Presidents of the National Rifle Association